Qezel Hesar (also Romanized as Qezel Ḩeşār; also known as Ghezel Hesan and Qizil Hisār) is a village in Mofatteh Rural District, in the Central District of Famenin County, Hamadan Province, Iran. At the 2006 census, its population was 134, in 33 families.

References 

Populated places in Famenin County